ViroCap is a test announced in 2015 by researchers at Washington University in St. Louis which can detect most of the infectious viruses which affect both humans and animals. It was demonstrated to be as sensitive as the various Polymerase chain reaction assays for the viruses. It will not be available for clinical use until validation studies are done, which may take years. The test examines two million sequences of genetic data from viruses. The research was published in September 2015 in the online journal Genome Research.

References

External links
GenomeWeb, "WUSTL Team Develops Virome Capture Technique"

Molecular biology
Laboratory techniques
Biotechnology
Molecular biology techniques
American inventions
2015 introductions